Dietmar Berchtold (born 6 August 1974) is an Austrian football midfielder.

References

External links
 

1974 births
Living people
People from Bludenz
Austrian footballers
Wiener Sport-Club players
SK Vorwärts Steyr players
LASK players
SV Waldhof Mannheim players
PAOK FC players
Apollon Smyrnis F.C. players
Alemannia Aachen players
VfL Bochum players
SW Bregenz players
SV Ried players
SC Austria Lustenau players
FCV Farul Constanța players
Grazer AK players
2. Bundesliga players
Association football midfielders
Footballers from Vorarlberg